John Savile, 2nd Earl of Mexborough (8 April 1761 – 3 February 1830), styled Viscount Pollington between 1766 and 1778, was a British peer and politician.

Background
Mexborough was the son of John Savile, 1st Earl of Mexborough, and Sarah (née Delaval).

Political career
Mexborough succeeded his father in the earldom in 1778. However, as this was an Irish peerage it did not entitle him to a seat in the British House of Lords (although it did entitle him to a seat in the Irish House of Lords). In 1808 he was elected to the House of Commons for Lincoln, a seat he retained until 1812.

Family
Lord Mexborough married Elizabeth, daughter of Henry Stephenson, in 1782. Elizabeth died in 1821 and is buried in the church at Methley with a monument by Robert Blore.

He died in February 1830, aged 68, and was succeeded in the earldom by his son, John.

References

External links 
 

1761 births
1830 deaths
Savile, John, 02 Earl of Mexborough
Politics of Lincoln, England
Members of the Parliament of the United Kingdom for English constituencies
UK MPs 1807–1812
UK MPs who inherited peerages
Earls of Mexborough